Jason Alfred Batty (born 23 March 1971) is a New Zealand former professional footballer, who played as a goalkeeper, and is the current New Zealand National Team Assistant/Goalkeeping Coach. Batty frequently represented the New Zealand national team in the 1990s.

Batty later became the Assistant coach at Dartmouth College in the U.S. and served as the Director of Goalkeeping for Texas Premier SC. Batty spent eight seasons as Goalkeeper Coach in the MLS with the San Jose Earthquakes, where they got to the Eastern Conference Final in 2010 and won the MLS Supporters Shield in 2012. He then was named Assistant Coach for New Zealand Youth National Teams. In 2018 Batty was appointed Assistant / Goalkeeping Coach in the National Women's Soccer League for new expansion club Utah Royals FC along with the Real Salt Lake Academy. From 2019 to the present, Batty is an Assistant and Goalkeeping Coach with the New Zealand national football team. Batty is currently the Academy GK Director of MLS side Nashville SC.

Club career 
Batty was born in Auckland, New Zealand. He started his career at Norwich City F.C. in their Academy system, he then moved back in New Zealand for a period of time before heading back overseas to join up with Bohemian F.C. in the League of Ireland. He then made 14 appearances for a Singapore team S-League before joining the Football Kingz. Batty made 16 appearances for the Football Kingz in their inaugural season in the NSL in 1999 before heading back to the UK for a spell in England with Championship side Grimsby Town in August 2000. He failed to dislodge regular shot stopper Danny Coyne and understudy Steve Croudson. After only six months he left the club and joined Scunthorpe United on similar terms but left at the end of the season after failing to make a 1st Team appearance. He then briefly played for Stalybridge Celtic in the Conference League.

International career 
Batty made his New Zealand A-international debut in a 3–0 win over Singapore on 21 February 1995 and quickly became first choice goalkeeper. He went on to collect 55 caps between 1994 and 2003. Playing in two FIFA Confederation Cup tournaments in 1999 in Mexico and 2003 in France.

Coaching career 
In 2003, Batty started his coaching career as the Assistant and Goalkeeping Coach for both Men's and Women's programs at Dartmouth College. 
In 2008, Batty was hired as an Assistant and Goalkeeping Coach for the MLS side San Jose Earthquakes.
In 2014, Batty was retained as Assistant Coach for the MLS side San Jose Earthquakes following several coaching changes at the club.
In 2016, Batty became Goalkeeping Coach for the U17 & U20 New Zealand national team.
In 2018, Batty was hired as Assistant and Goalkeeping Coach for the National Women's Soccer League for new expansion club Utah Royals and the MLS side Real Salt Lake Academy.
In 2019, Batty became goalkeeper coach for the New Zealand national team.
In 2020, Batty was hired as Academy Goalkeeper Director at MLS side Nashville SC.

Honours

As player 
 New Zealand Player of the Year: 1997
 OFC Nations Cup: 1998, 2002

As coach 
 MLS Supporters Shield: 2012

References

External links

1971 births
Living people
Association footballers from Auckland
New Zealand people of English descent
New Zealand association footballers
New Zealand international footballers
Association football goalkeepers
National Soccer League (Australia) players
North Shore United AFC players
Wroxham F.C. players
Albuquerque Geckos players
Bohemian F.C. players
California Gold players
Dartmouth Big Green men's soccer players
League of Ireland players
Football Kingz F.C. players
Grimsby Town F.C. players
Scunthorpe United F.C. players
Stalybridge Celtic F.C. players
USL League Two players
San Jose Earthquakes non-playing staff
Geylang International FC players
Singapore Premier League players
USL Second Division players
1996 OFC Nations Cup players
1998 OFC Nations Cup players
1999 FIFA Confederations Cup players
2000 OFC Nations Cup players
2002 OFC Nations Cup players
2003 FIFA Confederations Cup players
New Zealand expatriate association footballers
Expatriate footballers in England
Expatriate soccer players in the United States
Expatriate association footballers in the Republic of Ireland
Expatriate footballers in Singapore
New Zealand expatriate sportspeople in England
New Zealand expatriate sportspeople in the United States
New Zealand expatriate sportspeople in Ireland
New Zealand expatriate sportspeople in Singapore
Caversham AFC players
Utah Royals FC non-playing staff